The 1989 Australian Film Institute Awards were awards held by the Australian Film Institute to celebrate the best of Australian films and television of 1989. The awards ceremony was held at the Palais Theatre in Melbourne on Wednesday 11 October 1989 and broadcast on ABC-TV.

Feature film

Television

References

External links
 Official AACTA website

AACTA Awards ceremonies
1989 in Australian cinema